Stephen R. Alger (born 28 July 1958) is a tennis player who competed for Bermuda at the 1988 Summer Olympics. He is the only tennis player having represented Bermuda at an Olympic event.

References

External links
 
 

Tennis players at the 1988 Summer Olympics
1958 births
Bermudian male tennis players
Olympic tennis players of Bermuda
Tennis players at the 1991 Pan American Games
Pan American Games competitors for Bermuda
Living people
Central American and Caribbean Games bronze medalists for Bermuda
Central American and Caribbean Games medalists in tennis